Tim Prinsen (born March 1, 1971) is a former professional Canadian football offensive lineman who is currently the running backs coach for the Saskatchewan Roughriders of the Canadian Football League (CFL). He was drafted fourth overall by the Hamilton Tiger-Cats in the 1997 CFL Draft and played three seasons for the team, including a Grey Cup win in 1999. He then played for his hometown Eskimos for five seasons where he won his second championship in 2003. He played college football for the North Dakota Fighting Sioux.

References

External links
Edmonton Eskimos profile page

1971 births
Living people
Canadian football offensive linemen
Edmonton Elks coaches
Edmonton Elks players
Hamilton Tiger-Cats players
North Dakota Fighting Hawks football players
Players of Canadian football from Alberta
Canadian football people from Edmonton
Alberta Golden Bears football coaches
Saskatchewan Roughriders coaches